In mathematics, in the area of algebra known as group theory, an imperfect group is a group with no nontrivial perfect quotients.

The class of imperfect groups is closed under extension and quotient groups, but not under subgroups.  If G is a group, N, M are normal subgroups with G/N and G/M imperfect, then G/(N∩M) is imperfect, showing that the class of imperfect groups is a formation.  The (restricted or unrestricted) direct product of imperfect groups is imperfect.

Every solvable group is imperfect.  Finite symmetric groups are also imperfect.  The general linear groups PGL(2,q) are imperfect for q an odd prime power.  For any group H, the wreath product H wr Sym2 of H with the symmetric group on two points is imperfect.  In particular, every group can be embedded as a two-step subnormal subgroup of an imperfect group of roughly the same cardinality (2|H|2).

References

 

Properties of groups